The green-tailed sunbird (Aethopyga nipalensis) or Nepal yellow-backed sunbird is a species of bird in the family Nectariniidae.

It is found in Nepal the northern regions of the Indian subcontinent, stretching eastwards into parts of Southeast Asia.

Its natural habitats are temperate forests and subtropical or tropical moist montane forests. In southeast Szechwan and Yunnan, it lives in open mountain woods with moss-covered trees, from 1825 to 3350 meters elevation.

References

External links

green-tailed sunbird
Birds of Nepal
Birds of Eastern Himalaya
Birds of China
Birds of Southeast Asia
green-tailed sunbird
Taxonomy articles created by Polbot